Saint-François-Longchamp is a commune in the Savoie department in the Auvergne-Rhône-Alpes region in south-eastern France. On 1 January 2017, the former communes of Montaimont and Montgellafrey were merged into Saint-François-Longchamp.

See also
Communes of the Savoie department

References

Communes of Savoie